Santa Lucia Football Club is a football club from the urban locality of Santa Luċija in southern Malta.

History 
Santa Lucia Football Club was founded in 1974. In 2019, the club achieved promotion to the Maltese Premier League for the first time in its history.

The club's biggest rivals are Tarxien Rainbows and Gudja United.

Players

Current squad 
As of 6 January, 2023

 

 

 
Association football clubs established in 1974
Football clubs in Malta
1974 establishments in Malta